The Woman That Dreamed About a Man, also known as The Woman Who Dreamt of a Man, is a 2010 erotic psychological drama film directed by Per Fly and starring Sonja Richter, Marcin Dorociński and Mikael Nyqvist. The film is an international co-production between Denmark, Poland, Norway and Sweden.

Plot
Karen, a successful Danish fashion photographer, is working so constantly that she has little time for her husband and daughter. While working in Paris, she spots a handsome man on the street, becoming instantly attracted to him. Maciek is a professor at Warsaw School of Economics visiting from Poland, and she pursues him relentlessly, even going so far as to follow him all the way to Warsaw and ensconcing herself in an apartment right across the street from the apartment where he lives with his wife and family. While Maciek initially encourages the romance, he soon tires of Karen and tries to extricate himself from the relationship.

Cast
 Sonja Richter as Karen
 Marcin Dorociński as Maciek
 Michael Nyqvist as Johan
 Alberte Blichfeldt as Josefine
 Tammi Øst as Marie
  as receptionist
  as Jacques
 Olga Bołądź as Olga
  as Tomek
  as receptionist in Poland
 Michał Chilicki as old man on Hotel Europejski
 Teresa Owczynnikow as old woman in Poland
 Hubert Zawojek as Maciek's son

Film festivals
 2009 Norwegian International Film Festival (Work in Progress section)
 2009 Stockholm International Film Festival (Work in Progress section)
 2010 Leeds International Film Festival (official selection)
 2010 Lübeck Nordic Film Days
 2010 Seville European Film Festival (Eurimages section)
 2010 Taormina Film Fest (Beyond the Mediterranean section)
 2011 Helsinki International Film Festival (Nordic Exports section)
 2011 Norwegian International Film Festival (Nordic Focus section)
 2011 TOFIFEST International Film Festival (Forum 2010/2011 section)
 2012 Göteborg International Film Festival (Nordic Light section)

References

External links
 
 
 
 

2010 films
2010 drama films
2010s English-language films
2010s erotic drama films
2010s psychological drama films
Adultery in films
Danish erotic drama films
English-language Danish films
English-language Norwegian films
English-language Polish films
English-language Swedish films
Films about fashion photographers
Films directed by Per Fly
Films set in Copenhagen
Films set in Paris
Films set in Warsaw
Films shot in Copenhagen
Films shot in Paris
Films shot in Warsaw
Norwegian drama films
Polish erotic drama films
Swedish erotic drama films
Zentropa films
2010s Swedish films